Tamás Pál Kiss (born 19 May 1991 in Miskolc) is a Hungarian auto racing driver.

Career

Karting
Kiss made his karting début in 1998 when he was seven years old. During ten years he scored three titles in Hungarian Championships

Formula Renault
After competing in regional Hungarian Championship E-2000 in 2007 and 2008, Kiss moved into the LO Formule Renault 2.0 Suisse in 2008 and finished fourteenth with points-scoring finishes in six in the eight races with Speed Box ASE. In 2009, Kiss switched to the Hitech Junior Team, to contest a full season of Formula Renault UK. He had seventeen point-scoring finishes on his way to thirteenth place in the championship and third in the Graduate Cup.

Kiss remained in the series with the newly renamed Atech Grand Prix team. He had improve to the third place in the championship, with eight podiums and three wins in Thruxton,  Rockingham and Oulton Park.

GP3 Series
Kiss will graduate in GP3 Series with Tech 1 Racing in 2011.

Racing record

Career summary

 As Pál Kiss was a guest driver, he was ineligible for points.

Complete GP3 Series results
(key) (Races in bold indicate pole position) (Races in italics indicate fastest lap)

Complete Formula Renault 3.5 Series results
(key) (Races in bold indicate pole position) (Races in italics indicate fastest lap)

Complete Auto GP results
(key) (Races in bold indicate pole position) (Races in italics indicate fastest lap)

Complete FIA European Rallycross Championship results

Supercar

References

External links
Kiss career statistics from Driver Database
 

1991 births
Living people
Sportspeople from Miskolc
Hungarian racing drivers
Formula Renault 2.0 Alps drivers
British Formula Renault 2.0 drivers
Formula Renault Eurocup drivers
GP3 Series drivers
Auto GP drivers
European Rallycross Championship drivers
Virtuosi Racing drivers
World Series Formula V8 3.5 drivers
BVM Target drivers
CRS Racing drivers
Tech 1 Racing drivers